Albert Bathurst Piddington KC (9 September 1862 – 5 June 1945) was an Australian lawyer, politician and judge. He was a member of the High Court of Australia for one month in 1913, making him the shortest-serving judge in the court's history.

Piddington was born in Bathurst, New South Wales. He studied classics at the University of Sydney, and later combined his legal studies with teaching at Sydney Boys High School. Piddington was elected to the New South Wales Legislative Assembly in 1895, representing the Free Trade Party. He was defeated after a single term, and subsequently returned to his legal practice, becoming one of Sydney's best-known barristers. Piddington was sympathetic to the labour movement, and in April 1913 Andrew Fisher nominated him to the High Court as part of a court-packing attempt. His appointment was severely criticised, and he resigned a month later without ever sitting on the bench. Later in 1913, Piddington was made the inaugural chairman of the Inter-State Commission, serving until 1920. He was appointed King's Counsel in 1913, and remained a public figure into his seventies.

Early life
Piddington was born on 9 September 1862 in Bathurst, New South Wales. He was educated at Sydney Grammar School, and then studied at the University of Sydney. He graduated in 1883 with a Bachelor of Arts, winning the University Medal in Classics. He was appointed a vice-warden at the university's St. Paul's College in 1884, and from 1887 was a lecturer in English at the university. About this time he also started studying law. He was admitted to the New South Wales Bar in 1890.

In 1896, Piddington married Marion Louisa O'Reilly, who remained active in the social reform of liberal sex education and as a promoter of eugenics.

Political career

In 1895, Piddington was elected to the New South Wales Legislative Assembly for the electoral district of Tamworth, defeating the former Premier of New South Wales Sir George Dibbs. In 1896, he married Marion Louisa O'Reilly; their son Ralph became professor of anthropology at the University of Auckland. He was not a delegate to the second constitutional convention in 1897–1898, and campaigned against the proposed constitution, although supporting federation in general. He retired from politics in 1898. In 1910, Piddington was elected to the council of the University of Sydney. The following year, he was appointed as a Royal Commissioner by the Government of New South Wales to inquire into labour shortages, and was appointed a commissioner again in 1913 to inquire into industrial arbitration in New South Wales. During this time he continued to practise law and was employed at Sydney Boys High School.

High Court appointment
Piddington was one of four Justices appointed to the High Court in 1913. The bench had been expanded from five to seven justices that year, and foundation justice Richard O'Connor had died late in 1912. The Attorney-General Billy Hughes, under Prime Minister Andrew Fisher, took the opportunity to try to stack the court. The Fisher Labor government put forward a constitutional referendum in 1911, proposing to give the federal government increased power over corporations and industrial relations, and to allow it to nationalise monopolies. It was defeated in all states but Western Australia. Fisher held another referendum in 1913 on the same issues, but that was also defeated. In this context, Fisher and Hughes were looking for justices who would have a broad interpretation of the Constitution of Australia, particularly of Section 51, which divides powers between the federal and state governments. If the constitution was interpreted broadly, then the need for referendums might be circumvented.

Hughes contacted Piddington's brother-in-law, poet and politician Dowell O'Reilly, to ask about Piddington's view on states' rights. O'Reilly was not sure, and contacted Piddington (who was arguing a case before the Privy Council in London at the time) by telegram. The message reached him in Port Said, Egypt on 2 February. Piddington replied: "In sympathy with supremacy of Commonwealth powers."  Hughes then officially offered Piddington an appointment, which he accepted. Both the New South Wales and Victorian Bars, and the press, spoke out against Piddington's appointment. The Bulletin led a strong media campaign against Piddington. William Irvine refused to welcome Piddington as a judge on behalf of the Victorian Bar. Ultimately Piddington resigned from the High Court one month after his appointment, having never sat at the bench. Hughes, who had been widely criticised for trying to stack the court, labelled Piddington a coward after the incident, and called him a "panic-stricken boy".

Piddington was one of six justices of the High Court to have served in the Parliament of New South Wales, along with Edmund Barton, Richard O'Connor, Adrian Knox, Edward McTiernan and H. V. Evatt.

Later life

In September 1913, Piddington was appointed as the chairman of the Interstate Commission by Joseph Cook, the new Commonwealth Liberal Party Prime Minister. It had been rumoured that Hughes would be appointed to that position, and it has been suggested that Cook appointed Piddington to spite Hughes, or to rebuke Hughes for turning on Piddington.  Nevertheless, he remained Chairman until the legislation under which he and the other two commissioners had been appointed was invalidated by the High Court. In 1919 he was made a Commissioner in both the Royal Commission on the Sugar Industry and the Royal Commission on the Basic Wage. In 1913 he was made a King's Counsel, and from 1926, he served as President of the Industrial Commission of New South Wales. He held that position until 1932, when following Governor of New South Wales Sir Philip Game's dismissal of the Lang government, Piddington resigned in protest, despite being just a few weeks short of being entitled to a pension.

In 1934 he appeared in the High Court with Maurice Blackburn for Egon Kisch when he won his case to stay in Australia.

In 1940, Piddington returned to the High Court as a plaintiff. Two years earlier, he had been seriously injured when struck by a motorcycle while crossing Phillip Street in Sydney;  he sued for negligence. Unsuccessful in the Supreme Court of New South Wales, he appealed to the High Court. Piddington won the appeal but was unsuccessful in the retrial in the Supreme Court.

Piddington's memoirs, "Worshipful Masters" was published in 1929. Piddington died in Mosman on 5 June 1945.

References

1862 births
1945 deaths
Justices of the High Court of Australia
Members of the New South Wales Legislative Assembly
People educated at Sydney Grammar School
University of Sydney alumni
Australian King's Counsel